Dewal Manal is one of the 51 union councils of Abbottabad District in the Khyber-Pakhtunkhwa province of Pakistan.

Location
Dewal Manal is located in the central part of Abbottabad District and borders Nara and Seer Gharbi (to the South), Nathia Gali and Nagri Bala to the east, and Garhi Phulgran to the west and north. The area is scenic, with mountains, pine trees, and lakes, such as Jandar Lake.

Subdivisions
The Union Council is subdivided into the following areas: Chehr, Makol Payeen, Nagri Payeen, Haari Khetar, Khann Thoha Tarairi Nalotha, and Sajikot.

The villages of union council are Cher, Saji Kot, Dewal, Makol Payeen, Nagri Payeen and Nalotha.

Central Valley:
The central village of Dewal-Manal union council is Dewal. The population here is almost 99% Karlal (Bakaryal clan). 
Surrounded villages are:

 Sajikott
 Cher
 Kalanda
 Nara
 Ghora
 Narwara
 Pathian
 Nagri Payeen
 Nagri Tarli
 Makool Payeen
 Poona
 Hairla Maira.

History
 
The village of Dewal Manal is situated in the Dhun <دهن> valley. The word dewal came from an Urdu word Dewalia <ديواليه>, meaning 'bankrupt', which was attached to this locale due to many wars and other disasters. The villages here have been destroyed many times. During British rule the area was initially a major command post for the local Karlals, but the British made a fort at Nara.
 
This village produced notable politician like Haider Zaman Khan known as Baba (late), QUAID E TEHREEK E SOOBA HAZRA HAZARA PROVINCE MOVEMENT.

References

Union councils of Abbottabad District

fr:Dewal Manal